The 2020–21 Charleston Southern Buccaneers men's basketball team represented Charleston Southern University in the 2020–21 NCAA Division I men's basketball season. The Buccaneers, led by 16th-year head coach Barclay Radebaugh, play their home games at the Buccaneer Field House in North Charleston, South Carolina as members of the Big South Conference.

On February 23, 2021, Charleston Southern canceled the remainder of their season due to COVID-19 pandemic considerations. They finished the year with a 3–18 overall record (2–15 conference) and 11th place out of 11 Big South teams.

Previous season
The Buccaneers finished the 2019–20 season 14–18, 7–11 in Big South play to finish in a three-way tie for seventh place. They defeated Presbyterian in the first round of the Big South tournament before losing in the quarterfinals to Radford.

Roster

Schedule and results

|-
!colspan=12 style=| Regular season

|-

Source

References

Charleston Southern Buccaneers men's basketball seasons
Charleston Southern Buccaneers
Charleston Southern
Charleston Southern Buccaneers men's basketball
Charleston Southern Buccaneers men's basketball